Shepherd's Delight, also known as the House on Part of Camelsworthmore, is a historic home located near Still Pond, Kent County, Maryland.  It has a four-bay-long, -story main section with porches both front and back, and a four-bay-long, -story kitchen wing. It was built between 1767 and 1783, and added to again about 1810. Also on the property are two barns and a brick stable with modern sheds attached.

It was listed on the National Register of Historic Places in 1976.

References

External links
, including photo from 1977, at Maryland Historical Trust

Houses on the National Register of Historic Places in Maryland
Houses in Kent County, Maryland
Houses completed in 1767
1767 establishments in Maryland
National Register of Historic Places in Kent County, Maryland